Sulakshana Madhukar Naik (born 10 November 1978) is an Indian former cricketer who played as a wicket-keeper and right-handed batter. She appeared in two Test matches, 46 One Day Internationals and 31 Twenty20 Internationals for India between 2002 and 2013. She played domestic cricket for Mumbai and Railways.

In January 2020 she was appointed as a member of the Cricket Advisory Committee at the BCCI.

References

External links
 
 

1978 births
Living people
Marathi people
Cricketers from Mumbai
Indian women cricketers
India women Test cricketers
India women One Day International cricketers
India women Twenty20 International cricketers
Railways women cricketers
Mumbai women cricketers
West Zone women cricketers
Central Zone women cricketers
Wicket-keepers